was a Japanese student who tried to assassinate the Crown Prince Regent Hirohito in the Toranomon Incident on December 27, 1923.

Family and early life
Daisuke Nanba was born to a distinguished family. His grandfather was decorated by the Emperor Meiji. His father was a Member of the Imperial Diet until the act of his son forced him to resign.
Before he was 21 years old, Nanba showed no signs of having any sympathy for the radicals, and was even thinking about becoming an officer in the army.

Political thought
After 1919, a series of events influenced him greatly. At school in Tokyo, he attended political lectures and demonstrated in support of the suffrage movement in 1920. As a result of his father's position, he had the chance to hear Prime Minister Hara Takashi's opposition to extending the franchise. Angry against the politicians, he became more critical of his father's role and felt that some direct action was necessary.  
He began reading the works of Marx and Lenin as well as leftist magazines. In April 1921, he was affected greatly by Professor Kawakami Hajime's article on Russian Revolution. He was convinced that the revolution succeeded because dedicated terrorists made sacrifices. The following month's newspaper account about the High Treason Incident increased his indignation at the government. In late 1923, angered by the murders of Japanese anarchists and Koreans during the panic of the Great Kanto earthquake, he made up his mind to carry out the assassination.

Toranomon incident
The assassination attempt, known as the Toranomon incident, took place on 27 December 1923 at the Toranomon intersection between Akasaka Palace and the Diet of Japan in downtown Tokyo, Japan. Crown Prince and Regent Hirohito was on his way to the opening of the 48th Session of the Imperial Diet when Nanba fired a small pistol at his carriage. The bullet shattered a window on the carriage, injuring a chamberlain, but Hirohito was unharmed.

Prosecution, execution and aftermath
Although Nanba claimed that he was rational (a view agreed upon in the court records), he was proclaimed insane to the public. On 13 November 1924, he was found guilty at an extraordinary session of the Supreme Court of Japan. When Chief Justice Yokota of the Supreme Court condemned Nanba to death, Nanba defiantly yelled back: "Long live the Communist Party of Japan!" He was executed by hanging two days later.

His father and his married sister exiled themselves to Java, Dutch East Indies in order to escape the disgrace which Nanba, by his act, had brought upon the family.  The family reportedly changed its name to "Kurokawa".

See also

Japanese resistance during the Shōwa period
Assassination attempts on Hirohito

References

1899 births
1924 deaths
20th-century executions by Japan
People executed for treason against Japan
Executed Japanese people
People executed by Japan by hanging
Japanese communists
20th-century executions for treason
Hirohito
People executed for attempted murder
Failed regicides
People from Yamaguchi Prefecture
Executed communists